"The Rover" is a song by English rock band Led Zeppelin written by guitarist Jimmy Page and singer Robert Plant.  Although mostly recorded years earlier, it was released on the group's 1975 double album, Physical Graffiti.

Recording and release
Writing for the song began in 1970 at Bron-Yr-Aur, a rustic retreat in South Snowdonia, Wales. Initially an acoustic piece, it took on a hard rock arrangement when recorded at Stargroves during the sessions for the Houses of the Holy album in 1972. The song was not included on the album, but after Jimmy Page added several guitar overdubs in 1974, it was added to Led Zeppelin's following album, Physical Graffiti.

Reception
In a contemporary review of Physical Graffiti, Jim Miller of Rolling Stone gave "The Rover" a mixed review, saying that while Page and Bonham "mount a bristling attack", the track "suffers from Plant's indefinite pitch."

In a retrospective review of Physical Graffiti (Deluxe Edition), Jon Hadusek of Consequence of Sound described Jimmy Page's guitar lines in "The Rover" as some of his most underrated guitar lines he's ever recorded.

Live performances
"The Rover" was never played live in its entirety at Led Zeppelin concerts, although the band played the opening bars as an introduction to "Sick Again" throughout their 1977 North American tour. However, the song was rehearsed in full, as can be heard on bootleg recordings of the band's soundcheck rehearsal at the Chicago Stadium on 6 July 1973. This rehearsal took place before the opening date of the second leg of the band's 1973 North American tour.

See also
List of cover versions of Led Zeppelin songs"The Rover" entries

Notes
Citations

References

1975 songs
Led Zeppelin songs
Song recordings produced by Jimmy Page
Songs written by Jimmy Page
Songs written by Robert Plant